Estadio Municipal Carlos Tartiere is a multi-use stadium in Oviedo, Spain. With a capacity of 30,500 seats, it is the 17th-largest stadium in Spain and the largest in Asturias. The new Carlos Tartiere replaced the former stadium of the same name built in 1932, as the home venue of Real Oviedo. The stadium has held three games of the Spain national football team (the city has held seven in total), one game of the Spain national under-21 team and another one of the Asturian autonomous team.

History
The first stone of the construction was placed on 18 June 1998 and the first match played in this stadium took place on September 17, 2000, a Primera División match between Real Oviedo and Las Palmas. The stadium was officially opened on September 20, 2000, with a friendly match between Real Oviedo and FK Partizan.

The new stadium has been criticised by a number of different sources, especially about its location, which does not have adequate access and emergency exits for large attendances. Furthermore, the pitch is hard to maintain, due to its moist environment and lack of sunlight, especially during the winter. In addition, the large openings in the facade, which make it a cold stadium, are also subject to criticism, as well as its lack of color, with predominance of gray both inside, in the seating area, and outside, by the uncovered facade of concrete. Despite this, Emilio Llano, one of the architects of the stadium, has defended the stadium and claimed that "the problem could be in the grass and not in the subsoil".

The first sold-out match was on 28 October 2001, in the first Asturian derby in the new stadium. Sporting de Gijón won that game by a score of 0–2.

On 24 May 2009, Real Oviedo beat the attendance record in a Tercera División game with 27,214 spectators. It was in the first leg of the 2009 Group Winners play-off against RCD Mallorca B, and the blues won 1–0.

International matches
The first international game was held on 23 December 2000, when the autonomous team Asturias played a friendly game against Macedonia. 25,000 people were in attendance at the game, which finished 1–0 with a goal from Juanele.

Spain has played three times in the new Carlos Tartiere. The first time, on 6 June 2001, against Bosnia and Herzegovina in a game which finished in a 4–1 Spanish victory and the second, on 12 September 2007, against Latvia, finishing with a 2–0 home win. On 5 September 2015 in  UEFA Euro 2016 qualifying, Spain won against Slovakia 2-0.

In 2011, the Spain national under-21 football team played an official game against Poland, winning 2–0.

Spain matches at Carlos Tartiere

League attendances
This is a list of league and playoffs games attendances of Real Oviedo at the new Carlos Tartiere stadium.

The new stadium was closed off for one game after a game against Sporting de Gijón in the 2002–03 season. The game outside this stadium is not included in the stats. It was played at Estadio Román Suárez Puerta in Avilés in front of 1,500 fans against Levante in the last fixture of the season, when Oviedo had already dropped to Segunda División B. In addition, matches played behind closed doors due to the COVID-19 pandemic are not included.

References

External links
 Estadios de Espana 

Real Oviedo
Football venues in Asturias
Sports venues completed in 2000